Okhta may refer to:

Geography
Okhta, a river in northwestern Russia
Bolshaya Okhta and Malaya Okhta, municipal okrugs of Saint Petersburg, Russia

Buildings
Okhta Center, a future business center in Saint Petersburg, Russia
The Okhta Trne church at Mokhrenes, Nagorno-Karabakh, supposed to be dating from the fifth to seventh century

See also
Ohta (disambiguation)
OTA (disambiguation)